Article 4 of the European Convention on Human Rights prohibits slavery and forced labour. Conscription, national service, prison labour, service exacted in cases of emergency or calamity, and "normal civic obligations" are excepted from these definitions.

Violations found by the European Court of Human Rights

Siliadin v France, application No. 73316/01 (adjudicated in 2005; case of servitude and forced or compulsory labour)
Rantsev v Cyprus and Russia, application No. 25965/04 (adjudicated in 2010; case of human trafficking)
C. N. and V. v France, application No. 67724/09 (adjudicated in 2012)
C. N. v the United Kingdom,  application No. 4239/08 (adjudicated in 2012)
Chitos v Greece application No. 51637/12 (adjudicated in 2015)
L. E. v Greece, application No. 71545/12 (adjudicated in 2016)
Chowdury and others v Greece, application No. 21884/15 (adjudicated in 2017)
S. M. v Croatia, application No. 60561/14 (adjudicated in 2018)
T. I. and others v Greece, application No. 40311/10 (adjudicated in 2019)

Literature

History
R v. Knowles, ex parte Somersett (1772)
Slavery at common law
Thirteenth Amendment to the United States Constitution

See also
European Convention on Human Rights

References

External links
Slavery, servitude and forced labour cases under the European Convention on Human Rights 
Summary of Siliadin v. France
Summary of Rantsev v. Cyprus and Russia
Summary of L. E. v. Greece
Slavery, servitude, and forced labour ECtHR factsheet, 2015

4
Unfree labour